Chekovo is a rural locality (a selo) in Nebylovskoye Rural Settlement, Yuryev-Polsky District, Vladimir Oblast, Russia. The population was 442 as of 2010. There are 12 streets.

Geography 
Chekovo is located 38 km southeast of Yuryev-Polsky (the district's administrative centre) by road. Zhelezovo is the nearest rural locality.

References 

Rural localities in Yuryev-Polsky District
Vladimirsky Uyezd